Manavari (also Romanized as Manāvarī, Manavvarī, and Manūrī; also known as Manavvarī Dīzgarān) is a village in Harasam Rural District, Homeyl District, Eslamabad-e Gharb County, Kermanshah Province, Iran. At the 2006 census, its population was 109, in 27 families.

References 

Populated places in Eslamabad-e Gharb County